Shushary (from Finnish Suosaari, "marshy island") is a municipal settlement in Pushkinsky District of the federal city of St. Petersburg, Russia, located on the slopes of the Pulkovo Heights.  Population: 

Shushary gained importance in 1838 as the location of the first railway siding in the Russian Empire and one of the first railway stations in the country.  A living-history steam-engine museum chronicles the town's long association with the Russian Railways.

In the beginning of the 21st century, Shushary was transformed into an industrial area comprising automotive plants such as Toyota, General Motors (now owned by Hyundai), and Magna International.

References

External links
Shushary Steam-Engines Museum. Part I
Shushary Steam-Engines Museum. Part II

Municipal settlements under jurisdiction of Saint Petersburg
Pushkinsky District, Saint Petersburg
Geography of Saint Petersburg